The Morel dam is situated near Kankariya village in Lalsot city in the state of Rajasthan in India.

Geography
Dist.- Dausa and Sawai Madhopur

State- Rajasthan

River name- Morel

Name of Tributary- Morel

Length- 805(m)

Basin- Morel

Nearest City- Lalsot
Exact location- Peelukhera Kalan

Type of Dam- Earthen Dam 

Year of Completion- 1959

Purpose of Dam-	Irrigation

The dam is now with water, and villagers use the water for farming purposes.

References

http://india-wris.nrsc.gov.in/wrpinfo/index.php?title=Morel_Bund/_Bundh_JI01573

Dausa district
Dams in Rajasthan
Year of establishment missing

 

Other name -- khatava ka dam